This list includes all naval ships which have been in service of the Spanish Navy.

Aircraft carriers

 Dédalo-class seaplane tender (1)
  (1922–1940) (ex-Neuenfelds 1901-1921)
  (1)
  (R01) (1967–1989) (ex- 1943-1955)
  (1)
  (R11) (1988-2013)

Amphibious

 English Xlighter:
 K-1 to K-26 (1924–1962) ex British X4, X6, X13, X14, X16, X17, X26, X50, X63, X74, X91, X108, X109, X129, X141, X148, X153, X170, X172, X173, X174, X186, X190, X 200, X205 y X221
 Tipo BDK
 BDK-1 renamed LCT-1. Ex-HMS LCT(4) 1253, ex- Foca (1948–1978)
 BDK-2 renamed LCT-2. Ex-HMS LCT(4) 1323, ex- Morsa (1948–1983)
 BDK-3 renamed LCT-3. (1957-)
 BDK-4 renamed LCT-4. (1957-)
 BDK-5 renamed LCT-5. (1957-)
 BDK-6 renamed LCT-6. (1966–2004)
 BDK-7 renamed LCT-7 renamed A-07. (1966–1997)
 BDK-8 renamed LCT-8 renamed A-08. (1966–2004)
 LCM3 (1957-)
 LCM-1 a LCM-19
 LSM
 LSM-1 ex-USS LSM-329 (1960–1977)
 LSM-2 ex-USS LSM-331 (1960–1976)
 LSM-3 ex-USS LSM-343 (1960–1976)
 TA-10  (APA) (1)
 TA-11 Aragon (1964–1982) (ex-APA218 Noble 1944–1964)
 TA-20  (AKA) (1)
 TA-21 Castilla (1965–1982) (ex-AKA53 Achernar 1944–1963)
 L-10 Terrebone Parish-class tank landing ship (LST) (3)
 L-11 Velasco (1971–1994) (ex-LST1156 Terrebonne Parish 1952–1971)
 L-12 Martín Álvarez (1971–1995) (ex-LST1168 Wexford County 1954–1971)
 L-13 Conde de Venadito (1972–1990) (ex-LST1159 Tom Green County 1953–1972)
 L-20 Paul Revere-class amphibious transport (LPA) (2)
 L-21 Castilla (1980–1998) (ex-LPA248 Paul Revere 1958–1980)
 L-22 Aragón (1980–2000) (ex-LPA249 Francis Marion 1958–1980)
 L-30 Casa Grande-class dock landing ship (LSD) (1)
 L-31 Galicia (1971–1988) (ex-LSD25 San Marcos 1945–1970)
 L-40  (2)
 L-41 Hernán Cortes (1995–2009) (ex-LST-1197 Barnstable County 1971–1994)
 L-42 Pizarro (1995–2012) (ex-USS Harlan County 1971–1995)

Armed launches

The Spanish Navy operated many lanchas cañoneras in the latter half of the 19th century including:
Pronta (1872-1885)
Zaragoza
Viva (1872-1890)
Ligera (1872-1890)
Manatí (1875-1893)
Diligente classDiligente (1876-1899)
Atrevida (1877-1899)
Tarifa (1879-1900)
Caridad (1879-1898)
Lealtad (1881-1888)
Lista (1881-1888)
Otálora (1881-1898)Basco classBasco (1883-1899)
Gardoqui (1883-1899)
Urdaneta (1883-1899)
Lince (1887-1890)Cóndor classCóndor (1888-1902)
Cuervo (1892-1900)
Águila (1892-1900)Perla classPerla (1889-1928)
Rubí (1889-1899)
Diamante (1889-1899)Estrella classEstrella (1895-1898)
Flecha (1895-1898)
Ligera (1895-1898)
Lince (1895-1898)
Satélite (1895-1898)
Vigía (1895-1898)Alerta classAlerta (1895-1900)
Ardilla (1895-1898)
Cometa (1895-1898)
Fradera (1895-1898)
Gaviota (1895-1898)
Golondrina (1895-1898)Almendares classAlmendares (1895-1898)
Baracoa (1895-1898)
Cauto (1895-1898)
Guantánamo (1895-1898)
Yumurí (1895-1898)
Mayarí (1895-1898)Lanao classLanao (1895-1898)
General Blanco (1895-1898)Corcuera classCorcuera (1895-1898)
Almonte (1895-1898)
Oceanía (1898)

Auxiliary shipsCoastal water tankersÁfrica > A-5 (1925–1954)
A-1 (1933–1977)
A-2 (1933–1984)
A-3 (1935–1965)
A-4 (1935–1968)
A-6 > AA-06 > Contramaestre Castelló (1952–1996)
A-7 > AA17 (1952–1982)
A-8 (1952–1977)
A-9 > AA-21 > A-62 Maquinista Macias (1963–1993)
A-10 > AA-22 > A-63 Torpedista Hernandez (1963–2004)
A-11 > AA-23 > A-64 Fogonero Bañobre (1963–1993)
A-65 Marinero Jarano (1981–2010)
A-66 Condestable Zaragoza (1981–2009)Fleet oilersPlutón (1934–1970), ex Campsa oiler Campillo
A-11 Teide (1956–1988)
A-11 Marques de la Ensenada (1991–2012)School ShipsNautilus (1886–1925) ex Carric Castle
 Galatea (1922–1969)Alcofar Nassaes 1971 p=53 ex Glenlee – ex Islamount - ex Clarastella, preserved as Glenlee at Glasgow.Submarine rescue shipKanguro (1920–1943)Training shipsA-77 Salvora (2001-2012)
A-79 Hispaniola (2011-2012)TransportsSan Quintín
San Francisco de Borja
Patiño
Marqués de la Victoria
Ferrol
San Antonio
Legazpi (ex-mercantile Zamboanga ex-Formosa) (attached to Cuban squadron during the Spanish–American War)
Cebú (ex-mercantile Julieta) (attached to the Philippines squadron during the Spanish–American War)
 (1895-1898) (Captured by USN in the Spanish–American War).
Almirante Lobo (1909-1942)
Contramaestre Casado
Tarifa (ex-Castillo de Arevalo)
 A-05 El camino español (ex-Araguary) (1984/1999-2019)
 A-04 Martín Posadillo (ex-Cala Portas) (2000-2020)Salvage shipBattleships

Pre-dreadnought
  (1888–1925)
Dreadnought
  (3)
  (1913–1923)
  > España (1915 > 1931-1937)
  (1921–1937)

Carracks and Galleons
 List of carracks and galleons (1410-1639)

CorvettesF-50 Descubierta class (1)
F-51 Descubierta (1954–1970)F-60 Atrevida class (Descubierta modernized*) (5)
F-61 Atrevida (1955/1960*-1992)
F-62 Princesa (1959–1991)
F-63 Diana (1960–1973)
F-64 Nautilus (1959–1991)
F-65 Villa de Bilbao (1960–1992)F-30 Descubierta class (4)
F31 Descubierta (1978–2000) > P75 Descubierta (2000–2009)
F32 Diana (1979–2000) > M-11 Diana (2000–2015)
F35 Cazadora (1981–2004) > P78 Cazadora (2004–2018)
F36 Vencedora (1982–2004) > P79 Vencedora (2004–2017)

CruisersAragón class (3)
Aragón (1881–1898)
Navarra (1884–1899)
Castilla(1886–1898)Velasco class (8)
Velasco (1881–1898)
Gravina (1881–1884)
Infanta Isabel (1885–1926)
Isabel II (1886–1900)
Cristobal Colon (1889–1895)
Don Juan de Austria (1890–1898)
Conde de Venadito (1891–1900)
Don Antonio de Ulloa (1889–1898)Isla de Luzon class (3)
Isla de Luzon (1887–1898)
Isla de Cuba (1887–1898)
Marques de la Ensenada (1894–1900)Reina Regente class (3)
Spanish cruiser Reina Regente (1888–1895)
Alfonso XIII (1898–1900)
Spanish cruiser Lepanto (1898–1908)Alfonso XII class (3)
Alfonso XII (1891–1900)
Reina Cristina (1890–1898)
Reina Mercedes (1892–1898)Infanta Maria Teresa class (3)
Infanta Maria Teresa (1893–1898)
Vizcaya (1894–1898)
Almirante Oquendo (1895–1898)Giuseppe Garibaldi class (1)
Cristobal Colón (1897–1898)Emperador Carlos V class (1)
Emperador Carlos V(1897–1931)Rio de la Plata class (1)
Rio de la Plata (1900–1931)Extremadura class (1)
Extremadura (1902–1931)
Princesa de Asturias-class (3)
Cardenal Cisneros (1903–1905)
Cataluña (1908–1928)
Princesa de Asturias (1903–1927)Reina Regente class (1)
 (1910–1926)Navarra class (1)
Reina Victoria Eugenia > Republica > Navarra (1923>1934>1936-1955)Blas de Lezo class (2)
Blas de Lezo (1925–1932)
Mendez Nuñez (1924–1963)Almirante Cervera class (3)
Almirante Cervera (1928–1965)
Principe Alfonso > Libertad > Galicia (1927>1936>1939-1970)
Miguel de Cervantes (1930–1964)Canarias class (2)
Canarias (1936–1975)
Baleares (1936–1938)

DestroyersDestructor class (1)Destructor (1887–1909)Furor class(6)
Furor (1897–1898)
Pluton (1897–1898)
Terror (1897–1925)
Audaz (1898–1924)
Osado (1898–1924)
Proserpina (1898–1931)Bustamante class (3)
Bustamante (1914–1930)
Villamil (1916–1932)
Cadarso (1917–1931)Alsedo class (3)
Alsedo (1924–1957)
Velasco (1924–1957)
Lazaga (1925–1961)Churruca I class (7)
Sanchez Barcáiztegui (1928–1964)
José Luis Díez (1929–1965)
Almirante Ferrándiz (1929–1936)
Lepanto (1930–1957)
Churruca (1931–1963)
Alcalá Galiano (1931–1957)
Almirante Valdés (1933–1957)Churruca II class (7)
Almirante Antequera (1935–1965)
 (1936–1970)
Ciscar (1936–1957)
Escaño (1936–1963)
Gravina (1936–1963)
Jorge Juan (1937–1959)
Ulloa (1937–1963)Liniers class (Churruca III, modernized*) (2)
D-51 Liniers (1951/1962*-1982)
D-52 Álava (1951/1962*-1978)Alessandro Poerio/Huesca class (2)
Huesca (1937–1953) (ex-Alessandro Poerio 1915-1937)
Teruel (1937–1948) (ex-Guglielmo Pepe 1915-1937)Aquila/Mărăşti/Ceuta class (2)
Ceuta (1937–1948) (ex-Falco, ex-Viscol 1919-1937)
Melilla (1937–1950) (ex-Aquila 1916-1937) (ex-Vifor 1919-1937)D-30 Audaz class (9)
D-31 Audaz (1953–1974)
D-32 Osado (1955–1972)
D-33 Meteoro (1955–1974)
D-34 Furor (1960–1974)
D-35 Rayo (1958–1974)
D-36 Ariete (1961–1966)
D-37 Temerario (1964–1975)
D-38 Intrépido (1965–1982)
D-39 Relámpago (1965–1975)D-20 Fletcher/Lepanto class (5)
D-21 Lepanto (1957-1985) (ex-DD550 Capps 1943-57)
D-22 Almirante Ferrándiz (1957–1987) (ex-DD551 Taylor 1943-57)
D-23 Almirante Valdés (1959–1986) (ex-DD509 Converse 1942-59)
D-24 Alcalá Galiano (1960–1988) (ex-DD779 Jarvis 1944-60)
D-25 Jorge Juan (1960–1988) (ex-DD678 McGowan 1943-60)D-40 Oquendo class (3)
D-41 Oquendo (1963–1978)
D-42 Roger de Lauria (1969–1982)
D-43 Marqués de la Ensenada (1970–1988)D-60 Gearing FRAM II/Churruca class (5)
D-61 Churruca (1972–1989) (ex-DD711 Eugene A. Greene 1945-72)
D-62 Gravina (1972–1991) (ex-DD882 Furse 1945-72)
D-63 Méndez Núñez (1973–1992) (ex-DD889 O'Hare 1945-73)
D-64 Lángara (1973–1992) (ex-DD879 Leary 1945-73)
D-65 Blas de Lezo (1973–1991) (ex-DD841 Noa 1945-73)

FrigatesF-30 Pizarro class, (ex-Gun boats) (6)
F-31 Pizarro (1946–1970)
F-32 Hernán Cortés (1947–1971)
F-33 Vasco Núñez de Balboa (1947–1965)
F-34 Martín Alonso Pinzón (1948–1966)
F-35 Magallanes (1948–1971)
F-36 Sarmiento de Gamboa (1950–1974)F-40 Vicente Yáñez Pinzón class, (ex-Gun boats), (Pizarro modernized*) (2)
F-41 Vicente Yáñez Pinzón (1949/1960*-1983)
F-42 Legazpi (1951/1960*-1978)F-70 Baleares class (5)
F-71  (1973–2004)
F-72  (1974–2005)
F-73  (1975–2004)
F-74  (1975–2009)
F-75  (1976–2006)

GunboatsMindanao class 2nd class gunboats
Mindanao (1860- )
Calamianes (1860- )
Paragua (1860- )
Mindoro (1860- )
Luzón (1860- )
Panay (1860- )
Samar (1860- )
Cebú (1860- )Bulusán class 2nd class gunboats
Bulusán (1860- )
Joló (1860- )
Mariveles (1860- )
Arayat (1860- )
Pampanga (1860- )
Bojeador (1860- )
Balanguingui (1860- )
Albay (1861- )
Mactán (1861- )
Taal (1861- )Ericsson class 2nd class wooden screw gunboats
Ericsson (1869-1897)
Activo (1869-1885)
Rápido (1869-1880) sunk in bajo de los Colorados
Argos (1869-1885)
Lince (1869-1885)
Centinela (1869-1885)
Guardián (1869- )
Vigía (1869- )
Astuto (1869-1885)
Almendares (1869- )
Eco (1869-1885)
Destello (1869-1885)
Contramaestre (1869-1898)
Marinero (1869-1885)
Soldado (1869-1873) naufragó
¿Quién Vive? (1869-1872) renamed Celaje, boarding by merchant ship Clara
Lebrel (1869-1873) boarding
Cazador (1869- )
Cauto (1869-1891)
Gacela (1869- )
Telegrama (1869- )
Criollo (1869-1898)
Ardid (1869-1885)
Indio (1869-1897)
Caribe (1869-1885)
Alarma (1869- )
Descubridor (1869-1897)
Yumurí (1869- )
Flecha (1869- )
Dardo (1869-1885)
Cuba Española (1870-1898) 2nd class wooden screw gunboat
Martín Álvarez (1871-1876)
Rayo (1874-1883)
Callao (1874-1888)Salamandra class 2nd class wooden screw gunboats (except Salamandra which was iron)
Salamandra (1874-1898)
Cocodrilo (1875-1899)
Pelícano (1874-1898)Fernando el Católico class 1st class iron screw gunboats
Fernando el Católico (1875-1898)
Marqués del Duero (1875-1898)
 Somorrostro class 2nd class gunboats
Somorrostro (1875- ) modified to water tank ship in 1892
Ebro (1875-1896)
Bidasoa (1875-1900)
Teruel (1875-1896)
Nervión (1875-1896)
Toledo (1875-1900)
Tajo (1875-1895)
Arlanza (1875-1928) modified to water tank ship in 1899
Turia  (1875-1878)
Segura (1875-1900)
Prueba (1875-1893)Jorge Juan class iron screw avisos
Jorge Juan (1876-1898)
Sánchez Barcáiztegui (1876-1895)
Martín Álvarez (1878-1882)Clase Pilar 2nd class iron screw gunboats
Pilar (1881-1900)
Paz (1881-1889)
Eulalia (1882-1897)
Alsedo (1882-1898)
Clase General Lezo  2nd class iron screw gunboats
General Lezo (1885-1898)
General Concha (1887-1913)
Magallanes (1885-1903)
Elcano (1885-1899)
Mac-Mahón class 2nd class steel screw gunboat
Mac-Mahón (1888-1932)Álvaro de Bazán classMaría de Molina (1902-1926)
Marqués de la Victoria (1902-1926)
Álvaro de Bazán (1904-1926)Recalde classRecalde (1910-1932)
Laya (1910-1940)
Bonifaz (1911-1932)
Lauria (1912-1940)Cánovas del Castillo classCanovas del Castillo (1923-1959)
Canalejas (1924-1951)
Eduardo Dato (1925-1953)Calvo Sotelo classCalvo Sotelo (1938-1957)

Ironclads

Broadside Ironclads
  (1863) - BU 1920
  (1863) - Blew up 30 December 1873
  (1864) - stricken 1873
  (1865) - BU 1910
  (1867) - stricken 1899
  (1869) - scrap in 1896Lledó Calabuig, 1998, p=86

Central Battery Ships
  (1869) - scrap in 1888. Ex- Screw frigate Resolución.Lledó Calabuig, 1998, p=87

 Minelayer F-00 Marte class (2)
F-01 Marte (1938–1971)
F-02 Neptuno (1939–1972)F-10 Júpiter class (Marte modernized*) (2)
F-11 Júpiter (1937/1960*-1974)
F-12 Vulcano (1937/1960*-1977)F-20 Eolo class (2)
F-21 Eolo (1941–1972)
F-22 Tritón (1943–1972)

Mine countermeasures vesselsM-00 Bidasoa class minesweepers (7)
M-01 Bidasoa (1946–1973)
M-02 Nervión (1946–1972)
M-03 Lérez (1947–1971)
M-04 Tambre (1946–1973)
-   Guadalete (1946–1954)
M-05 Segura (1949–1973)
M-06 Ter (1948–1972)M-10 Guadiaro class minesweepers (7)
M-11 Guadiaro (1953–1977)
M-12 Tinto (1953–1976)
M-13 Eume (1954–1977)
M-14 Almanzora (1954–1977)
M-15 Navia (1955–1979)
M-16 Eo (1956–1978)
M-17 Guadalhorce (1953–1978)M-20 Nalón class minesweepers (12)
M-21 Nalón (1954–1993) (MSC139) Adjutant class
M-22 Llobregat (1954–1979) (MSC143) Bluebird class
M-23 Júcar (1956-?) (MSC220) AMS218 class
M-24 Ulla (1956–1993) (MSC265) AMS218 class
M-25 Miño (1956–1999) (MSC266) AMS218 class
M-26 Ebro (1958–2005) (MSC269) MCS268 class
M-27 Turia (1955–1993) (MSC130) Adjutant class
M-28 Duero (1959-1999 (1954–1999)	(ex-MSC202 Spoonbill 1955-1959) Bluebird class
M-29 Sil (1959–2003) (ex-MSC200 Redwing 1955-1959) Bluebird class
M-30 Tajo (1959–2002) (MSC287) MCS268 class
M-31 Genil (1959–2004) (MSC288) MCS268 class
M-32 Odiel (1959–2004) (MSC279) MCS268 classM40 Aggressive class (4)
M-41 Guadalete (1971–1998) (ex-MSO432 Dynamic 1952-1971)
M-42 Guadalmedina (1971–1999) (ex-MSO463 Pivot 1954-1971)
M-43 Guadalquivir (1971–1999) (ex-MSO491 Persistent 1955-1971)
M-44 Guadiana (1972–2000) (ex-MSO473 Vigor 1955-1972)

Minor sailing vessels (incomplete)

 Atrevida (corvette)
 Descubierta (corvette)
 Favorita (corvette)
 Ferrolana (corvette) (1848–1897)
 Mazarredo (corvette) (1847–1890)
 Mexicana (schooner)
 Princesa (corvette)
 Sutil (schooner)
 Villa de Bilbao (corvette - later used as a school ship) (1845–1930)

Monitor and floating battery

Puigcerdá (1874-1900)
Duque de Tetuán (1874-1900)

Paddle steamers

Isabel II (ex-British Royal William, purchased 1834) - Renamed Santa Isabel in 1850.Don Álvaro de Bazán class (2)
Don Álvaro de Bazán.
Congreso.Andalucía class (2)
Andalucía.
Península.
Piles.
Vulcano.Alerta class (2)
Alerta.
Vigilante.Reina de Castilla class (3)
Reina de Castilla.
Magallanes.
Elcano.
Lepanto.
León.
Castilla.
Satélite.
Don Juan de Austria.
Narváez.Velasco class (2)
Velasco.
Conde de Regla.Clase Conde de Venadito (4)
Conde de Venadito.
Neptuno.
Guadalquivir.
General Lezo.
General Liniers.
Churruca.
Victoria de las Tunas.Ferrolano class (2)
Ferrolano.
Gaditano.
Blasco de Garay.Colón class (2)
Colón.
Pizarro.Antonio Ulloa class (2)
Antonio Ulloa.
Jorge JuanVasco Nuñes de Balboa class (2)
Vasco Núñez de Balboa 1856–1875.
 Hernán Cortés 1856–1890.Isabel II classIsabel II 1850-1882 renamed Ciudad de Cádiz in 1868.
Francisco de Asís, 1850, renamed Fernando el Católico in 1856, sunk, boarding by Numancia in 1873.
Isabel la Católica. 1850.
Fernado el Católico 1850, sunk in Cuba in 1856.

Patrol boats

 Clase Delfín
Delfín (1910–1927)
Dorado (1910–1929)
Gaviota (1910–1932)
Castle class (naval trawler)
Uad Kert. (1922–1967) ex-HMS Rother; ex-HMS Anthony Aslete
Uad-Lucus.Alcofar Nassaes, 1971, p=47 (1922–1939) ex-HMS Ness, ex-HMS Alexander Palmer
Uad-Martin. (1922–1954) ex-HMS Erne, ex-HMS John Chivers
Uad Muluya. (1922–1939) ex-HMS Waveney, ex-HMS James Connen
Uad-Ras.Alcofar Nassaes, 1971, p=48 (1922–1932) ex-HMS Wear, ex-HMS Thomas Mombworth
Uad-Targa.(1922–1931) ex-HMS Test, ex-HMS Patrick BoweMersey class (naval trawler)
Arcíla. ex-HMS William Doak (1922-)
Xauen. ex-HMS Henry Cramwell (1922-)Brisquard class (naval trawler)
Alcázar. ex Rengage French (1922–1951)
Larache. ex Poliu French (1922–1949) sunk in tres forcas cape
Tetuán. ex Grognard French (1922–1952)Suboficiales class (fish guards)
Condestable Zaragoza (1919-?)
Contramaestre Castelló (1919-?)
Maquinista Macias  (1919-?)
Torpedista Hernández (1919-?)
Cabo de infantería de Marina Garciolo (1919-?)
Marinero Cante (1919-?)
Fogonero Bañobre (1919-?)
Marinero Jarana (1919-?)Rigel classPegaso (1951-1974)
Procyon (1951-1974)Cies classCies (1952–1973)
Salvora (1952–1990)Centinela classCentinela (W-33) (1953–1977)
Serviola (W-34) (1953–1977)P-00 Lazaga class (6)
P-01 Lazaga (1975–1993)
P-02 Alsedo (1977–1993)
P-03 Cadarso (1976–1993)
P-04 Villaamil (1977–1993)
P-05 Bonifaz (1977–1993)
P-06 Recalde (1977–1993)P-10 Barceló class (6)
P-11 Barceló (1976–2009)
P-12 Laya (1976–2009)
P-13 Javier Quiroga (1977–2005); sold to Tunisia Navy
P-14 Ordóñez (1977–2009)
P-15 Acevedo (1977–2009)
P-16 Candido Perez (1977–2009)P-20 Anaga class (7)
P-21 Anaga (1980–2010)
P-23 Marola (1981–2010)
P-24 Mouro (1981–2010)
P-27 Izaro (1981–2010)
P-29 Deva (1982–2004)
P-30 Bergantín (1982–2010)
P-30 Grosa (1981–2012)P-30 Conejera class (4) 
P-31 Conejera (1981–2010); Sold to Senegal
P-32 Dragonera (1981–2010); Sold to Mozambique
P-33 Espalmador (1982–2010)
P-34 Alcanada (1982–2010)P-40 Cormorán class (1)
P-41 Cormorán (1990–1994)P-60 Chilreu class (1)
P-61 Chilreu (1992–2012)P-100 Aresa class (1)
P-101 (1978–2020)
P-111 (1975–2009)

Sail frigates
 List of sail frigates

Screw frigates

 Petronila class Berenguela 1857–1877.
 Petronila 1857–1863.
 Reina Blanca 1859-1882/93. Renamed Blanca
 Princesa de Asturias 1857–1909. Renamed Asturias in 1868, sold for scrap in 1914.
 Concepción class Concepción 1860–1897.
 Nuestra Señora del Carmén ~1862-1897. Renamed Carmen
 Lealtad class Lealtad 1860–1893. scrap in 1897.
 (Nuestra Señora del) Triunfo 1862-1864 blew up.
 Villa de Madrid 1863–1882/84.
 Gerona 1864–1898.
 Almansa 1864-1888/98.
 Navas de Tolosa 1865–1893.

Screw corvettes

Doña María de Molina (~1868-1886)
  (ex-Pampero, captured 1866)Narváez classNarváez
Consuelo
Wad-Ras
Vencedora
África
Santa Lucía
Diana

Screw schoonersCovadonga classCovadonga Captured by Chile 1865, sunk by Peruvian explosive boat 1880
Circe
Sirena
Andaluza
Guadiana
Huelva
Ligera
FavoritaSanta Filomena classSanta Filomena.
Valiente.
Constancia.
Animosa.Santa Teresa classSanta Teresa.
Isabel Francisca.
Buenaventura.
Concordia.
Santa Rosalía.
Edetana.
Céres.
Caridad.
Prosperidad (1865-).

Ships of the line

 List of ships of the line (1640-1858)

Submarines
 List of submarines of the Spanish Navy

 Isaac Peral´s submarine torpedo boat (1)
 Peral (1888–1890)
 Isaac Peral class (1)
  (1917–1930) (Holland type similar to )
 A class F/Laurenti (3)
 A-1 Narciso Monturiol (1917–1934)
 A-2 Cosme Garcia (1917–1931)
 A-3 (1917–1932)
 B class Holland F-105 (6)
 B-1 (1921–1941)
 B-2 (1922–1951)
 B-3 (1922–1940)
 B-4 (1923–1937)
 B-5 (1925–1936)
 B-6 (1926–1936)
 C class Holland F-105 (6)
 C-1 Isaac Peral (1928–1950)
 C-2 (1928–1951)
  (1929–1936)
 C-4 (1929–1946)
 C-5 (1930–1937)
 C-6 (1930–1937)
  (2)
 General Mola (1937–1958) (ex-Evangelista Torricelli 1934–1937)
 General Sanjurjo (1937–1959) (ex-Archimede 1935–1937)
 S-10 D class (1)
 S-11 (1947–1965)
 S-21 (1951–1971)
 S-22 (1954–1971)
 S-01 G Class Type VIIC (1)
 S-01 G-7 (1942–1970) (ex- 1941–1942)
 S-30  (5)
 S-31 Almirante García de los Reyes (1959–1982) (ex-USS 370 Kraken 1944-1959)
 S-32 Isaac Peral (1971-1980) (ex-USS 396 Ronquil 1944-1971)
 S-33 Narciso Monturiol (1972-1973) (ex-USS 382 Picuda 1943-1972)
 S-34 Cosme García (1972–1980) (ex-US S385 Bang 1943-1972)
 S-35 Narciso Monturiol (1973–1980) (ex-USS 368 Jallao 1944-1974)
 SA-40 Foca class (2)
 SA-41 (1963–1967) Preserved as museum ship at Mahon.
 SA-42 (1963–1967) Preserved as museum ship at Cartagena.
 SA-50 Tiburón class (2)
 SA-51 (1965–1979) Preserved as museum ship at Barcelona.
 SA-52 (1966–1979) Preserved as museum ship at Cartagena.
 S-60 Delfín class (4)
 S-61 Delfín (1973–2003) Since 2004 museum ship in Torrevieja
 S-62 Tonina (1973–2005) Awaiting destination, possible museum ship
 S-63 Marsopa (1975–2006)
 S-64 Narval (1975–2003)
 S-70 Agosta class (2)
 S-72 Siroco (1983–2012)
 S 73 Mistral (1985-2020)

Torpedo gunboat

Temerario classTemerario (1892-1916)
Nueva España (1894-1914)
Martín Alonso Pinzón (1893-1911)
Galicia (1894-1899)
Marqués de Molins (1895-1921)
Vicente Yañez Pinzón (1894-1902)Clase Filipinas
Filipinas (1895-1899)

Torpedo boats

Cástor class
Cástor (1878–1900)
Pólux class
Pólux (1879–1895)
Rigel class
Rigel (1883–1900)
Julian Ordoñez class
Julián Ordóñez (1885–1913)
Acevedo (1885–1913)
Retamosa class
Retamosa (1885–1900)
Orión class
Orión (1886–1915)
Barceló class
Barceló (1886–1911)
Habana class
Habana  (1886–1919)
Azor class
Azor (1887–1911)
Halcón (1887–1915)
Ariete class
Ariete (1887–1905)
Rayo (1887–1905)
Ejército class
Ejército (1888–1900)
T-1 class
T-1 (1912–1940)
T-2 (1912–1939)
T-3 (1912–1937)
T-4 (1913–1939)
T-5 (1913–1931)
T-6 (1914–1934)
T-7 (1915–1946)
T-8 (1915–1932)
T-9 (1915–1943)
T-10 (1915–1932)
T-11 (1916–1931)
T-12 (1916–1932)
T-13 (1916–1932)
T-14 (1916–1952)
T-15 (1917–1935)
T-16 (1917–1941)
T-17 (1917–1952)
T-18 (1918–1939)
T-19 (1920–1941)
T-20 (1920–1940)
T-21 (1921–1940)
T-22 (1921–1940)
G5 class
11 (1937–1946) renamed LT-15 after Spanish Civil War
21 (1937–1946) renamed LT-16 after Spanish Civil War
31 (1937-1938)
41 (1937-1937)
Schnellboote S-1 class
Badajoz (LT-15) (1937-1944) ex S-1 German
Falange (LT-13) (1936-1937) ex S-2 German
Oviedo (LT-12) (1937-1940) ex S-3 German
Requeté (LT-11) (1936-1946) ex S-4 German
Toledo (LT-14) (1939-1944) ex S-5 German
MAS
Sicilia (LT-18) (1937-?) ex MAS 100 Italian.
Nápoles (LT-19) (1937-?) ex MAS 223 Italian.
Cándido Pérez (LT-16) (1937-?) ex MAS 435 Italian.
Javier Quiroga (LT-17) (1937-1937) ex MAS 436 Italian.
Schnellboote S-38 class
German construction
LT-21 (1943–1956) Ex S-73 German
LT-22 (1943–1956) Ex S-78 German
LT-23 (1943–1956) Ex S-124 German
LT-24 (1943–1955) Ex S-125 German
LT-25 (1943–1955) Ex S-126 German
LT-26 (1943–1957) Ex S-145 German
Spanish construction
LT-27 (1953–1963)
LT-28 (1953–1963)
LT-29 (1953–1961)
LT-30 (1953–1977)
LT-31 (1956–1977)
LT-32 (1959–1974)

Preserved ships 

Most of the few retired Spanish Navy ships preserved as museum ships are submarines:
 Submarine Peral of 1888 is preserved in Cartagena (Murcia).
 Two units of the Foca class: SA-41 in Mahón (Balearic Islands) and SA-42 in Cartagena (Murcia).
 Two units of the Tiburón class: the SA-51 in Barcelona (Catalonia) and the SA-52 in Cartagena (Murcia).
 Delfín (S-61), of the Daphné class (S-60) is moored in Torrevieja (Province of Alicante, Valencian Community). Unlike the other submarines, it is not anchored on land but moored in the port, thus becoming the first "floating museum" of its kind in Spain.
 The Customs Surveillance Service patrol car Albatros III is also preserved in Torrevieja.
 Galatea, a barque that was a training ship for the Spanish Navy between 1922 and 1982, is preserved in Glasgow (Scotland, United Kingdom).

See also
 Spanish Republican Navy
 List of active Spanish Navy ships

References

Notes

Bibliography
 
 
 Alcofar Nassaes, José Luis (1971). Las fuerzas navales en la Guerra Civil española. Dopesa. .
 Villaamil, Fernando (1989). Viaje de circunnavegación de la corbeta Nautilus".. Madrid: Editorial Naval. ..
 Hardie, Hamishla (2004). restauración del Glenlee/Galatea. .
 Lledó Calabuig, José (1998). Buques de vapor de la armada española, del vapor de ruedas a la fragata acorazada, 1834-1885. Agualarga. 
 Coello, Juan Luis (1995). Buques de la Armada española años de la postguerra. Agualarga editores S.L.. 
 Coello Lillo, Juan Luis; Agustín Ramón Rodríguez González (2001). Buques de la Armada Española a través de la Fotografía. .

Ships of the Spanish Navy
Lists of ships of Spain